Torrita di Siena is a comune (municipality) in the Province of Siena in the Italian region of Tuscany, located about  southeast of Florence and about  southeast of Siena.

Torrita di Siena borders the following municipalities: Cortona, Montepulciano, Pienza, Sinalunga, Trequanda.

The most important event in Torrita di Siena is the "Palio dei Somari", a race among donkeys, which is run on Saint Joseph's Day (Torrita's patron saint) or the Sunday after this date.

History 
The name "Torrita" appears for the first time on a code dated 1037. The castle, subject to the sovereignty and defense of the Republic of Siena, was protected by a wall equipped with squared towers and four gates: Porta a Pago, Porta Gavina, Porta Nuova and Porta a Sole. It was an advanced Siena stronghold (castrum) during the fight against Montepulciano. Later, in 1554, it was conquered by Florence and it was subject since then to the power of the Medici.

Starting from the beginning of the 20th century, Torrita di Siena saw a big economic development, especially in woodcraft manufacturing.

References

External links

 Official website
 Tourism in Torrita di Siena

Cities and towns in Tuscany